The Audi S4 is the high performance variant of Audi's compact executive car A4.  The original Audi S4, built from 1991 until 1994, was a performance-oriented version of Audi's 100 saloon/sedan.  All subsequent S4s since 1997 have been based on the Audi A4; and as the A4 has evolved from one generation to the next, so has the S4.

A more powerful internal combustion engine, larger upgraded brakes, firmer suspension, larger wheels, and distinctive sheetmetal, styling clues and badging have always been amongst the many upgrades the S4 receives over its mainstream 100 and A4 siblings. In markets where the even higher-performance Audi RS 4 is not offered, the S4 is the top-of-the-line trim of the A4 family.

Like its regular A4 counterpart, all S4 variants have had longitudinally oriented, front-mounted engines.  A single turbocharged 2.2-litre inline five-cylinder powered the original C4 version, and a 2.7-litre twin turbocharged V6 engine was found in the B5 generation. The B6 and B7 versions shared a common 4.2-litre V8 engine, the first time that a V8 engine was placed in a compact executive car, placing it in direct competition with the BMW M3 and Mercedes-Benz C55 AMG which at the time had a 3.2 L inline 6. The B8 generation uses a supercharged 3.0-litre V6 TFSI engine and competes with the both BMW 335i and BMW 335i/340i xDrive, and Mercedes-Benz C350. The recently introduced B9 generation is powered by a turbocharged 3.0-litre V6 TFSI engine, as opposed to a supercharger like in the previous iteration. This current generation competes with the BMW M340i xDrive and Mercedes-Benz C450 AMG/Mercedes-AMG C43 4MATIC.

All versions of the S4 have their transmission mounted immediately at the rear of the engine in a longitudinal orientation, in the form of a transaxle, and like all Audi "S" cars, are only available as standard with Audi's quattro all-wheel drive (AWD) system, using a Torsen-based centre differential system.

All versions of the S4 have been manufactured at Audi's plant in Ingolstadt, Germany; they are, or have been available as a four-door five-seat saloon and a five-door five-seat Avant (Audi's name for an estate car/station wagon) body styles since the model's inception in 1991. A two-door four-seat Cabriolet (convertible) S4 variant was introduced as part of the B6 and B7 generation A4 lineups. The B8 Cabriolet has now been built off the A5 coupe body style and the "S" variant is marketed under the Audi S5 nameplate.

C4 (Typ 4A, 1991–1994)

Factory production of the original Audi S4 (Typ 4A), usually known as Audi 100 S4, began in August 1991 to serve as the performance version of the newly updated C4 platform 100 four-door, five-seat saloon.  It was designed to replace the outgoing C3 based Audi 200 quattro turbo, which had been Audi's first true sports-saloon and had been discontinued at the end of 1990. Being the first S4 model from Audi, it is commonly referred to as the Ur-S4, derived from the  augmentive word (meaning: original).

Audi mildly updated the C4-based model line in 1994 and dropped the 100 nomenclature; all variants of the former Audi 100 line were now re-badged as the Audi A6.  In line with the switch in model name, Audi temporarily discontinued the use of the S4 name and began selling an updated but fundamentally identical version of the car, based on the "new" A6 and badged as S6.  Despite the change in name, differences between the outgoing S4 and incoming S6 were primarily cosmetic.

A more powerful, more expensive and more exclusive variant known first as the S4 Plus and later as the S6 Plus was available from October 1992 through to July 1994. Built in very small numbers, the "Plus" models featured numerous performance enhancing upgrades; including the use of Audi's 4.2-litre V8 engine in place of the then current inline-five engine.

An all-new C5-based Audi A6 debuted for 1997, after which the S4 and S6 became distinctly separate models based on very different platforms.

The C4 variant S4 ended factory production after less than three years in July 1994.

One of its most renowned owners was Ayrton Senna who owned a silver Avant, not least because he was the Audi distributor for Brazil.

C4 powertrain
In standard form, the powertrain detail of the C4-based S4 was available with only one engine, a single turbocharged and intercooled version of Audi's 2.2-litre 20-valve inline five-cylinder engine This displaced  and was equipped with an advanced Bosch Motronic electronic engine control unit (ECU).

Both five- and six-speed manual transmissions (parts code prefix: 01E, identification codes: five-speed: CBD, CET, six-speed: CBL, CMG) were offered to European customers, but a five-speed manual was the only transmission available in North America; a four-speed automatic transmission (parts code prefix: 01F, identification code: CBF) was available as an option worldwide. Front and rear axle final drive ratio is either 4.111 or 3.889 (dependent on transmission type), and the rear axle (parts code prefix: 017, identification codes: AAT, AET) uses a driver-selectable electro-pneumatic-mechanical switchable diff lock.

Audi's quattro four-wheel-drive system was standard on the C4 S4/S6; a first-generation Torsen-based system which used the "T-1" automatically biasing centre differential (ATB) was used on vehicles equipped with manual transmissions, while a transfer box based system was used on vehicles equipped with an automatic transmission.

S4/S6 "Plus" models equipped with a 4.2-litre  all-aluminium alloy V8 engine (parts code prefix: 077, identification code: ABH) became available to European customers as an option from October 1992, only with the six-speed manual gearbox, in either saloon or Avant body styles.

C4 steering, brakes, wheels & tires
All C4 S4s' came equipped as standard with a conventional fixed-assistance rack and pinion power assisted steering (PAS) system. An electronically controlled 'servotronic' system, which varied the level of assistance in accordance with the road speed, was available as an option.

There were two different types of high performance brake systems on offer for the C4 S4. US models had smaller  discs. A Bosch three-channel operation (four-channel sensing) Anti-lock Braking System (ABS) with a mechanical load sensing valve for the rear brakes was standard throughout production.

For wheel options, the standard five-arm "Fuchs" forged alloy wheels were 8.0Jx16H2 ET40, and were shod with 225/50 R16 sized tyres. Several other tyre and wheel designs were optionally available: a 7.5Jx15H2 ET40 six-spoke with 215/60 R15 tyres, an 8.0Jx16H2 ET40 five-double-spoke, a 7.5Jx16H2 ET35 six spoke "Avus", and an 8.0Jx17H2 ET40 ten-spoke.

B5 (Typ 8D, 1997–2002)

The second generation S4 (Type 8D), also known as the Audi S4 quattro debuted in 1997, with factory production commencing October 1997, as part of the facelifted B5 platform Audi A4 line-up, although it wasn't available in North America until late 1999.

In addition to the saloon (sedan), an estate version (wagon)–the Audi S4 Avant–was introduced into the lineup from 1998. Production of the B5 S4 ceased in September 2001, although it was still sold together with the next B6 platform generation through 2002 in North America. Examples produced July 2001 to end of production are 2002 Model Year cars, the 10th digit of the VIN being the number "2".

Several years after it was sold new, the B5 S4 remains a potent enthusiast car, and as featured in the December 2007 issue of Sport Compact Car magazine, a heavily modified, Torque Factory tuned S4 won a comparison test against several other extreme performance cars.

B5 powertrain
The powertrain details of the B5 S4 feature a 2.7-litre twin-turbo ('biturbo') 90° third-generation V6 engine (parts code prefix: 078, identification codes: AGB, AZB, APB). Details of the powerplant include a cast iron cylinder block with two lightweight aluminium alloy cylinder heads. The valvetrain includes 30 valves (five valves per cylinder), twin hybrid-driven (timing belt and roller chain) double overhead camshafts and variable valve timing for the inlet valves. The intake air is pressurized by two parallel water-cooled BorgWarner K03-series turbochargers; the charged air is cooled by two side-mounted air-to-air intercoolers (SMICs). Engine management was by way of a Bosch Motronic ME 7.1 (7.0 in North America) electronic engine control unit (ECU), and helped it meet the European EU-3D emissions standard.

As in the previous S4, a six-speed C90 manual transmission (parts code prefix: 01E, identification code: DSY, gear ratios: 1st: 3.500, 2nd: 1.889, 3rd: 1.231, 4th: 0.967, 5th: 0.806, 6th: 0.684) was standard equipment, as was the Torsen T-2 quattro permanent all-wheel drive system. Final drive (parts code prefix: 01H, identification code: DQA) ratio is 4.111. A five-speed ZF 5HP19 tiptronic automatic transmission (parts code prefix: 01V) became available for the first time as an option.

B5 suspension, brakes, wheels & tires
The B5 S4 is fitted with 4-wheel independent suspension.  The front suspension is a multi-link design with four individual control arms per wheel. The rear suspension is an unequal length double wishbone design; the lower control arms are mounted to a subframe which also carries the differential housing. Shock absorbers, coil springs, and anti-roll bars are fitted front and rear.

Two-piston Lucas HP2 brake calipers at the front (with four pads per caliper), with Lucas single-piston sliding brake calipers at the rear. A Bosch ABS 5.3 four-channel Anti-lock Braking System (with Electronic Brakeforce Distribution (EBD) and Electronic Differential Lock (EDL) - and later with ESP or Electronic Stability Programme), coupled with a vacuum servo completed the system.

Standard wheels were Audi's die-cast aluminium alloy six-arm 'Avus' 7.5Jx17H2 ET45 wheels, shod with 225/45 ZR17 performance tyres.

B5 colors & optional equipment
Available exterior colors included Brilliant Black, Laser Red, Light Silver, Cactus Green, Santorin Blue, Hibiscus Red, Casablanca White, Pearlescent White, Imola Yellow (spicy mustard), and Nogaro Blue. The last two colors were exclusive to the S4 model. Interior leather was available in Onyx or Silver. Available options included:
 Bose premium sound system
 Audi Navigation System
 6-disc CD changer
 Hands free Motorola cellular telephone
 Premium Package: Sunroof, HomeLink transmitter, Auto dimming mirrors
 Cold Weather Package: Heated front seats, Heated outside mirrors, Expandable ski sack
 Enhanced Sport Package: Alcantara seat inserts, Silver aluminum belt line trim or Carbon Fibre trim (on late 2000-2001 models), Aluminum mirror housings (on 2001 & 2002 models)

The Sport Package replaced the wood-grain belt line trim with silver aluminum trim, and the wood grain finish around the shifter with black plastic. The Alcantara seat inserts were silver (on Onyx leather). With the black, white, or blue exteriors, the inserts were also available in blue Alcantara.  On the early 2000 models, the Alcantara inserts in the rear seats did not fully extend forward to the front edge of the seat.

B5 motorsport
A motor racing version of the car achieved great success in the SpeedVision World Challenge with Michael Galati taking the 2001 SpeedVision GT title in a Champion Racing S4, winning four races, and helping Audi to its first Manufacturers' Championship.

The Audi Sport specification Champion A4 chassis included a B5 RS4 engine, and Alcon racing brake calipers (4 piston front and 2 piston rear calipers).

Don Istook, with Istook's Motorsports, built and campaigned several B5 S4's in first the Motorola Cup, and then the Grand Am Cup. The S4's were even raced by Istook's Motorsports in the Rolex GT category for several races to help fill the field. Of note, one of the S4's, racing against true GT cars, even ran as high as second place (in the rain) at Barber Motorsports Park. These S4's were built using existing S4, not RS4 engines, but used the B5 Audi RS4 K04 turbochargers.

B6 (Typ 8E/8H, 2003–2005)

The third generation Audi S4 quattro (Type 8E — saloon: 8E2, Avant: 8E5, and Cabriolet: 8H7) debuted its saloon and Avant bodystyles in Europe in March 2003, and appeared in North America slightly later. This was based on the latest Volkswagen Group B6 (PL46) platform used by the then current Audi B6 A4.  Despite having moved to an entirely new platform, one of the S4's most publicised new features was its new engine - a 4.2-litre V8 engine.  Following its initial launch of either a four-door five-seat saloon (sedan), or a five-door five-seat Avant (estate/wagon), it eventually became available in three bodystyles - and for the first time in the Audi 'S' car range, from February 2004, a two-door four-seat Cabriolet (convertible), Type 8H, was included in the model range.

This was considerably worse than the earlier V6 models, leading to the addition of a $1,700 gas guzzler tax (combined ) for the six-speed manual sedan in the United States.

The B6 S4 saloon and Avant variants ceased factory production in December 2004, with the Cabriolet ending twelve months later at December 2005.

B6 powertrain
Replacing the 2.7-litre 'biturbo' V6 engine of the previous generation B5 S4, the new B6 S4 powertrain gained an all-aluminium alloy 4.2-litre, 40 valve (five valves per cylinder) V8 engine (parts code prefix: 079.C, identification code: BBK), with chain-driven double overhead camshafts, roller-finger rocker arm cam followers, and included variable inlet camshaft timing. It also used a strengthened alloy crankshaft bedplate for the five main bearings, and a two-part baffled oil sump, and a light-alloy variable intake manifold (VIM), containing the fractionally sequentially actuated fuel injectors. Engine management was by way of a Bosch Motronic ME 7.1.1 electronic engine control unit (ECU), using a Bosch 'E-Gas' drive by wire electronic throttle, and powering eight individual spark coils with longlife quad-electrode Bosch spark plugs. Ignition timing is a mapped direct ignition, with cylinder-selective knock control with the aid of four knock sensors. The exhaust system includes vacuum-operated valves in the twin rear silencers (mufflers), finished with chrome plated tail-pipes.

Like its predecessors, the B6 S4 was standard with a Getrag six-speed (M6S) manual transmission (parts code prefix: 0A3, identification codes: FVD, HEP) (gear ratios - 1st: 3.667, 2nd: 2.050, 3rd: 1.462, 4th: 1.133, 5th: 0.919, 6th: 0.778), with a  single plate dry clutch, and Torsen T-2 quattro permanent four-wheel drive system. From July 2003, the ZF 6HP19 tiptronic automatic transmission (parts code prefix: 09L, identification codes: GUR, HHU) (ratios - 1st: 4.171, 2nd: 2.340, 3rd: 1.521, 4th: 1.143, 5th: 0.867, 6th: 0.691, with a final drive (identification code: GDF) ratio of 3.539) was included as an option.

An unusual sight in the engine compartment was the addition of water cooling for the 190 amp alternator, along with two additional thermostatically-controlled side-mounted radiators.

B6 steering, brakes, wheels & tyres
The B6 S4 came equipped with electronically controlled, variable assisted 'servotronic' rack and pinion power assisted steering (PAS) as standard.

B6 S4 brakes consisted of radially ventilated disc brakes front and rear. A Bosch ESP 5.7 Electronic Stability Programme system, complete with Anti-lock Braking System (ABS), Electronic Brakeforce Distribution (EBD), Emergency Brake Assist (EBA), Electronic Differential Lock (EDL) and Anti-Slip Regulation (ASR) - also known as traction control system, coupled with a dual-rate tandem vacuum servo provided the brake actuation.

B6 body & interior
Discrete lower door trims, along with the now trademark Audi 'S' model vertical-emphasis line grille, and solid aluminium (later replaced with plastic covered by aluminium) exterior door mirrors, and S4 badging front and rear are all that visually distinguish the S4 from its related A4 brethren. In the interior, front and rear Recaro seats (fronts fully electric with the option of heated seats), as well as S4 logos in the instrument panel and door sills complete the detail.

B7 (Typ 8E/8H, 2005–2009)

The Audi B7 platform Audi S4 quattro, based on the Audi B7 A4, debuted in late 2004. Although Audi classifies it as a new car, the differences between it and the outgoing B6 S4 casually appear to be primarily cosmetic, and is still classified by the internal designation: Typ 8E (although with revised sub-designations - saloon: 8EC, Avant: 8ED, and Cabriolet: 8HE).

There are a few mechanical changes, such as revised springs and dampers and, from model year 2007, an updated Torsen T-3 automatically biasing centre differential, featuring a 'default' asymmetric 40:60 front-rear torque split on manual transmission models, along with the later Bosch ESP 8.0 Electronic Stability Programme and gloss black painted brake calipers. The 'Avus-III' wheels now became an option, and were replaced by a standard offering 8.0Jx18 inch 'S-design' 7-spoke forged alloy wheel.

Bose sound system is now standard, whereas it was optional on the B6 S4, and an enhanced optional DVD-ROM-based RNS-E satellite navigation system replaces the previous CD-ROM-based RNS-D option.

The new trapezoidal single-frame grille, Bi-Xenon high-intensity discharge lamp (HID) headlamps, L-shaped tail-lamps, quad exhaust tail pipes, and discrete V8 badging below the side repeater indicators help distinguish the B7 from the previous B6 model.

Audi S4 25quattro

In June 2005, Audi announced a limited edition run of 250 special edition S4 saloon cars, celebrating 25 years of quattro four wheel drive. This exclusive model was called the Audi S4 25quattro. Available only in the United States, the exterior has unique front and rear bumpers, a carbon fibre boot lip spoiler and lower front splitter, a rear functional red tow hook, and a high gloss Phantom Black painted grille with the "quattro" emblem. 15-spoke DTM alloy wheels, along with optional dealer-fitted 'Audi four-rings' decals for the front doors complete the exterior makeover. Black and grey contrasting interior leathers, along with "quattro" embossed into the Recaro seats, together with a "1 of 250" exclusive quattro gear shift knob for the manual-only gearbox define the interior changes and act as a subtle reminder of the exclusivity that the limited numbers command.

On the mechanical side, the S4 25quattro was the second Audi, after the B7 RS4 to be fitted with the latest Torsen T-3 asymmetric ATB centre differential for its quattro permanent four-wheel drive system. Under normal grip conditions, this is set with a default rearwards torque distribution bias of 40:60 front to rear, and a maximum of 100% torque can automatically be apportioned to the rear axle (and up to 80% to the front) as conditions warrant. The final drive ratios are 3.889.

B8 (Typ 8K, 2009–2016)

From November 2008, the latest generation of the 'Audi S4 quattro' (Typ 8K) entered factory production.  It is based on the current Audi B8 A4, built on the Volkswagen Group MLB/MLP platform. Unlike the previous B6 and B7 models, the new B8 version was only available as a four-door five-seat saloon (sedan), or a five-door five-seat Avant (estate/wagon). The sport-performance two-door four-seat Cabriolet (convertible) mantle is now taken by the current Audi S5 Cabriolet and new Coupe. Unlike previous generations of the S4, only the sedan will be imported to the United States and Canada.

Compared to the previous B6/B7 S4 which used a 4.2-litre V8 engine, this latest B8 S4 uses a smaller displacement 3.0-litre TFSI V6 engine, but now with the addition of forced induction via an Eaton mechanical supercharger.

The previous B6/B7 S4s were the top-of-the-line models in North America, ahead of the 3.2L V6 and 4-cylinder 2.0T A4s, and competed with the BMW E46 330 and E90 335 respectively.  The 3.0 TFSI V6 engine replaces the 3.2-litre FSI V6 as the upgrade engine in the A4 and A6 lineups starting for 2009; both the 3.2-litre FSI and 3.0 TFSI were offered together until the end of the 2010 model year. The 3.2L V6 engine is no longer offered in the A4 lineup from the 2011 model year onwards, so the recently introduced B8 S4 is now priced 9% lower than its V8 predecessors, and slots directly above the 4-cylinder 2.0T base model. The S4 now compares more closely with the BMW 335i.

Previously unavailable enthusiast driver aids are now optional, such as Audi's Sport Rear Differential, active steering and adaptive damping suspension (part of the Audi Drive Select Package). The front axle was moved by 6.1 inches to the front, which improved the weight distribution of the B8 Platform.  Combined with the Sport Rear Differential Audi was able to greatly improve the weight balance and dynamics of the S4 over previous models.

A new designed wheel is included on the B8 S4, an 8.5Jx18" '5-double-spoke S' design alloy wheel with 245/40 ZR18 high performance tyres.  Optional 19 inch wheel and tyre packages are also available, sized at 8.5Jx19" alloy wheels with 255/35 ZR19 tyres. LED tail lights are standard fitment, along with Audi's now-trademark LED daytime running lights at the front.

The S4 along with the other B8 models received a facelift in early 2012 for the European market and early 2013 for the Australasian market. This included a revised front-end with new headlights and grille, an updated interior, and upgraded MMI options. Mechanically, the facelift B8 (known colloquially as the B8.5) was upgraded with electromagnetic steering and a lighter crown gear center differential.

B8 powertrain
At the heart of the B8 S4 powertrain is an all-new, all aluminium-alloy 3.0-litre TFSI Supercharged (TFSI) V6 engine (parts code prefix: 06E, identification code: CAKA), and like the rest of the B8 model range, now with Fuel Stratified Injection (FSI). This high power output is achieved by using forced induction – and specifically, an all-new Eaton 'Twin Vortices Series' (TVS) Roots-type positive displacement compressor. This new supercharger features twin four-lobe rotors, which are axially twisted 160 degrees. It is mounted on top of the engine, within the 'Vee', pumping air directly into the inlet manifold, and incorporates two separate water-cooled intercoolers. This new design of supercharger is said to reduce the noise, vibration, and harshness (NVH) of the engine.

This engine is mated to either a six-speed manual transmission (identification code: KMR) or a seven-speed 'S tronic' DL501 dual clutch transmission (identification code: LHK), the latter with steering wheel mounted paddle-shifters for tiptronic gear selection, which replaces the Tiptronic automatic transmissions found in the B6/B7 iterations. The 'Audi quattro Sports differential' fitted in the rear axle final drive unit is available as an option.

Acceleration from a standstill to  takes 5.1 seconds for the saloon with manual gearbox, the Avant one tenth of a second slower at 5.2 seconds. With figures like these, the B8 S4 accelerates more quickly than its V8-engined predecessors. Audi of America claims that the version of the S4 achieves 28 highway miles per gallon, and a 0 to  acceleration time of 4.9 seconds with the manual transmission and 5.1 seconds with the S tronic. Fuel consumption is rated at a combined . Therefore, the B8 S4, unlike the V8-powered B6/7 models, avoids the US gas guzzler tax. The B8 S4's 3.0 TFSI engine also gets only 1 m.p.g. less than the base 2.0 TFSI engine. This is one of the most important reasons for Audi to downsize their engines, while keeping the output equivalent better, by using forced-induction such as supercharging or turbocharging.

The same engine is shared with the Audi S5 Cabriolet (though the 7-speed S Tronic is the sole transmission) and the 2013 Audi S5 Coupe. Detuned versions of this engine making  are found in the 2009-11 Audi A6 3.0 TFSI (C6) mated to a 6-speed TipTronic automatic transmission, the 2012 Audi A6 3.0 TFSI (C7) and 2012 Audi A7 3.0 TFSI, the latter two which are paired with an 8-speed TipTronic automatic.

Motorsport
In motor racing, APR Motorsport has currently entered a B8 S4 in the Grand-Am Continental Tire Sports Car Challenge Grand Sport (GS) class.

B9 (Typ 8W, 2017–present)

Audi announced the B9 S4 in 2015, with the official unveiling of the European-spec model at the 2015 Frankfurt Motor Show. Noticeable changes to the B9 included a modern, more angular exterior, newly designed wheels, and a new turbocharged V6 engine. Unlike the pre-facelift B8 S4, the announced European-spec model is only available with an eight-speed torque converter automatic (ZF 8HP55a).

The new model uses LED main-beam and LED daytime running lights as standard, alongside dynamic turn signals and LED tail-lights. Like other Audi models, the notable feature in the new S4 is Virtual Cockpit which has Classic Layout and Sports Layout in displaying speedometer and tachometer.

The B9 S4 features standard 18-inch 5 double-spoke wheels with summer tires, or optional 19-inch 5 V-spoke wheels.

The B9's brakes use multi-piston calipers, replacing the single-piston sliding calipers of earlier models. LED headlights are standard while a flat-bottomed steering wheel, "S" embossed seats, and quad tailpipes differentiate the S4 from the B9 A4.

B9 powertrain

The engine uses a hot inside V layout, which places the cylinder head exhaust ports, exhaust manifolds, and turbocharger inside the V of the engine; this is a similar arrangement to the twin-turbo V8 engines used in Audi's C7/C8 RS6 and RS7 (including C7 S6/S7).

For outside of European markets, however, it still retains the 3.0-litre petrol turbo V6.

See also

Audi S6 (C4)
Audi S and RS models

References

External links
Audi.com - international corporate portal
Audi UK - S and RS models
Audi USA - S4

S4
Euro NCAP large family cars
Compact executive cars
Sports sedans
Station wagons
Convertibles
All-wheel-drive vehicles
Cars introduced in 1991
2000s cars
2010s cars